Kerstiaen de Keuninck (1560, Kortrijk – 1632, Antwerp), was a Flemish Baroque painter.

Biography

According to the RKD he is known for landscapes. His pupils were Engelbert Ergo and Carel van Ferrara.

Gallery

External links

References

Kerstiaen de Keuninck on Artnet

1560 births
1632 deaths
Flemish Baroque painters
People from Kortrijk